KELT-6b is an exoplanet orbiting the F-type subgiant KELT-6 approximately 791 light years away in the northern constellation Coma Berenices. It was discovered in 2013 using the transit method, and was announced in 2014.

Discovery 
In 2014, the planet's parameters were observed. The paper states that KELT-6 has just entered the subgiant phase, and is no longer on the main sequence. In 2015, an additional planet, c, was discovered using the radial velocity method.

Properties 
KELT-6b is a hot Saturn with 44.2% Jupiter's mass, but has been bloated to 1.3 times Jupiter's radius. It's density is half of Saturn's, and it has an equilibrium temperature of 1,313 K, but a hotter dayside temperature of 1,531 K.

References 

Coma Berenices
Exoplanets discovered in 2013
Exoplanets discovered by KELT